Ancient Greek folklore consists of the folklore of the ancient Greeks. The topic includes genres such as mythology (Greek mythology), legend, and folktales. According to classicist William Hansen, "the Greeks and Romans had all the genres of oral narrative known to us, even ghost stories and urban legends, but they also told all kinds that in most of the Western world no longer circulate orally, such as myths and fairytales."

Specific genres of folklore have been the topic of scholarly examination, including ghostlore. For example, classicist D. Felton notes that "the Greeks and Romans had many folk-beliefs concerning ghosts", and highlights a variety of instances of the genre in the Classical record.

Historically, classicists rarely delved into folklore studies.

See also
Modern Greek folklore
Roman folklore

Notes

References

Folklore
Greek folklore